Sorcery 101 was a webcomic written and illustrated by American artist Kel McDonald. Launched on May 12, 2005, the comic was originally drawn in black and white, but became full color on August 19, 2005.

Sorcery 101 first appeared on Comicgenesis and moved to Keenspot on July 27, 2006. The story, which is completed as of Oct 17, 2016, chronicles the life of Danny Gunn, a school teacher who is also an aspiring sorcerer. The comic has now left Keenspot and moved to Sorcery101.net.

While the comic has a largely supernatural cast, the storyline deals primarily with interpersonal relationships. The comic presents werewolves, vampires, and demons as essentially "normal" people dealing with their own talents and limitations.

Kel used the site Kickstarter to fund the first collection book.

Story

Sorcery 101 follows the life and troubles of Danny Gunn who is the former prince of Terra, a fictional country in the universe based roughly on England, but Danny is now a sorcerer-in-training, as well as a private school teacher. Along with a myriad cast of his friends and acquaintances, including but not limited to: his best friend Brad Wolfe; Brad's wife Ally and their daughter Rebecca; Danny's teacher, a vampire named Pat Warren; and the enigmatic elder vampire Seth, who has his own plans for Danny.

The story is set on a modern world closely resembling our own, but there are notable differences. In the series, vampires, demons, and werewolves have recently been discovered to be real, though most residents of this world still believe they are a hoax. The comic has a feel different from most supernatural comics. The story has modern firearms in use as well as ancient magics; cities and countries are named differently, but nevertheless seem to "match up" to real-world countries, such as Terra to the United Kingdom. Many works of popular culture like the film Star Wars and the TV show Avatar: The Last Airbender appear in the Sorcery 101 world. There are comics that are mildly amusing, but the main focus is on the story.

Final Notes from the writer of Sorcery 101

Characters

Main cast

Danny Gunn

Danny Gunn is the main character of the comic. He was born the prince of Terra, but Danny gave up his royal heritage after forming a blood bond with Seth.  Though the comic begins several years afterward, Danny looks younger than 35 years old, because the blood bond has also stopped his aging. Throughout the comic, it has been revealed that he is easily distracted by members of the opposite sex and that he is a chain smoker. Some time before the comic began he moved in with his friends, Brad and Ally Wolfe, in order to help babysit their rambunctious and preternaturally strong 5-year-old werewolf daughter named Rebecca.

Danny has an ex-wife and a seven-year-old daughter named Natalie, both of whom have appeared in the story so far. Danny is currently a teacher at a private all-boys high school wherein Jeff and Connor were in his class. He is currently teaching Con Law, with Connor and Ramon, a kid who he has accidentally slighted in the past.

Danny is taught sorcery by the vampire Pat Warren. Thus far Danny has been seen casting healing spells and learning fire spells in the comic, although according to Pat he also knows some powerful light spells.

Brad Wolfe

Brad Wolfe is a werewolf who has been friends with Danny for a long time. Thus far Brad has been shy and non-confrontational. The only time he has shown any violent behavior was when Ally was injured during the story arc "Wild Things." 

It was mentioned that being a werewolf gives Brad increased strength even while in human form. Brad also sports other wolf-like characteristics throughout Sorcery 101 while in human form, such as being colorblind.

Like Danny, Brad looks younger than he really is. Brad is also a big Star Wars fan. He made several references to the movie throughout the comic series.

Pat Warren

Pat Warren is a vampire who teaches Danny sorcery. Pat used to be an air mage. He learned sorcery after he was turned into a vampire, because his mage powers have faded since then. He has a hatred for inhuman creatures, and being one himself he has a very hostile disposition. Pat has also disliked Brad since they first met during the "Introduction" story arc. Despite his dislike of werewolves and because of some trickery by Seth, Pat currently has a claim on Jeff, therefore protecting him from capture by other vampires. Later in the comic, it is revealed that Pat is Ally's great-grandfather.

Ally Warren

Ally Warren is an air mage and demon hunter. She is married to Brad and is the boss of the house she, Brad, Danny, and Rebecca live in. Ally works as a manager of a bar frequented by demons. She has been shown to have a temper when it comes to people insulting her family.

Rebecca Wolfe

Rebecca is Brad and Ally's 5-year-old daughter. She has inherited lycanthropy from Brad, making her hard to handle for anyone who isn't a werewolf. She often gets into trouble and was the cause of Jeff's lycanthropy when she bit him whilst he was watching her.

Seth

Seth is the vampire character to whom Danny is blood bond. Since he first appeared during the "Predator" storyline, he has been portrayed as a smooth, suave, and an almost sociopathic guy. He created a blood bond with Danny and apparently has a claim on Brad. He keeps an eye over them both, more often than not at the promise of scotch. He is apparently quite famous in the vampiric community, with legends that he may be a storm god, the Antichrist or—his favorite rumor—that he was kicked out of Hell for fear of taking it over. Seth is hated by most people who know him. He can also endure sunlight without dying.

Seth has a dislike for another vampire named Frost.

Minor cast

Suryu

Suryu is a prominent vampire who runs the shapeshifter auction and catches Jeff. She seems to hate Seth's sire while at the same time lusting after Seth.

Aaron and Loki

Aaron and Loki are a team of mercenaries hired by Seth to assist him Brad and Danny in rescuing Jeff from Suryu's shapeshifter auction. It was revealed during a mission to break Ally's mother out of prison that Loki is apparently the vampire that killed Ally's father.

Jeff

Jeff is one of the students in the class Danny teaches. He and Connor are friends. At the beginning of the comic Jeff is a normal human. However, after a  chain of events, Rebecca bites him while Danny is watching her at school, and Jeff becomes a werewolf. He is now Rebecca's babysitter.

Connor

Connor is another one of the students in Danny's class. He is Jeff's friend and also seems to have fun making up rumors, namely ones about Danny being gay, though Connor himself is also gay.

Melanie

Melanie is a girl Danny went out with. She is often portrayed wearing a T-shirt that reads "MBI" standing for "Male Body Inspector." She does not seem fazed by Danny when he performs magic, or when she saw him with his tail while he was still a werewolf.

Natalie

Natalie is Danny's daughter with his ex-wife. She suffers from headaches due to her possessing an amount of magic that is above a normal human level, but below a mage's level. This is indicated by her violet colored eyes. To alleviate these headaches she must constantly learn or study, which she is exceptionally good at, as well as perform meditative techniques that she learned from Danny.

William

Pat's friend who runs a magic shop. He is also a seer, which is a fact that people, even Pat, often forget and are in turn shocked by his insight or knowledge.

Ramon

Ramon is a student in Danny's Con Law class. He has a desire to be a necromancer, although does not seem to be successful. He was kicked out of his last school from throwing dead animals at other students. Danny accidentally stepped on a toy of his, and since then Ramon has been upset with him.

Chapters
There are 38 total chapters for Sorcery 101 The list below may be incomplete.

Introduction - Here most of the main cast is introduced (with the exception of Seth). Danny has a  sorcery lesson from Pat. Brad and Danny go to rent a movie but Danny gets into an argument with a kid that claims to know necromancy but is almost as inept, if not more, at magic of any type as Danny.

Predators - Danny drives Ally to work and runs into a female snake demon. The snake demon invites him back to her hotel room and once there she robs Danny. Since Brad is at the movies, Ally is at work, and Pat is sleeping, Danny is forced to ask Seth for help.

Life Lessons - One of Danny's students steals his spell book and tries to cast a love spell on the girl he likes. It backfires and ends up affecting Connor instead.

Wild Things - Danny and Brad are captured by a group of wolf demons. Ally and Pat come to the rescue and quickly defeat the demons. Ally, Brad, and Danny go home while Pat chases after the demons that fled. Pat finds the demons killed before he can reach them. A few days later Danny is babysitting Rebecca while tutoring Jeff. Danny takes a cigarette break and leaves the room. Rebecca ends up biting Jeff. Ally and Danny go to stake out his house that next full moon but unfortunately Jeff is out drinking with his friend Connor. Jeff ends up puking in an alley and transforms shortly after. Two vampires capture him and he is put up for auction. Seth sees Jeff and later mentions it in passing to Danny. Danny, Brad, and Seth then go to rescue Jeff from a vampire named Suryu, who is the one selling him. Seth comes up with a master plan and ends up in a duel with her.

Responsibilities - Ally, Danny, and Pat go help Ally's cousin Rita handle a gang of demons.

Old Allies - While retrieving a book for Pat, Danny learns about Pat's past from William.

Out Come the Wolves - Danny is accidentally bitten by Brad while a bounty hunter is trying to kill Brad.

Business as Usual - Ally, Brad, and Danny break Ally's mom out of prison.

Migraines - Danny tries to find out what is wrong with his daughter in this chapter.

Attention to Detail - Danny and Pat are hired to help rescue a woman from Danny's cousin, Damien

My Permanent Accessory - While Ally is at a party with her boss, Seth pushes a drunk Brad to do something stupid. 

Glass Houses - Pat goes to ask Ally for help and instead gets help from Brad. 

New Class - School starts again and Danny is surprised to find out who one of his new students is. 

Holding out for a Hero - Damien shows up threatens Danny and kidnaps Melanie.

Frequently Secretly - Jeff thinks his friend Connor might know he's a werewolf.

Fathers - A friend of Brad's father asks him for help after finding out Brad's a werewolf. 

Ways of a Woman in Love - Trish and Seth explain how they met. 

Orders - Pat and Ally are arrested by the Mage Council.

References

External links
 
 
 
 
 

Fantasy webcomics
2005 webcomic debuts
2016 webcomic endings